The off side is a particular half of the field in cricket.

From the point of view of a right-handed batsman facing the bowler, it is the right-hand side of the field, or the half of the field in front of the right-handed batsman when he or she assumes the batting stance. The off side consists of the entire half of the field stretching from behind the batsman-end wicket, around third man, square of the wicket on the off side, the covers, and mid/long off, up to the opposite bowler-end wicket and, behind it, the straight field. To the opposing bowler facing a right-hand batsman, it is the left side of the field.  The left-handed batsman's off side is to the batsman's left and to the opposing bowler's right.

In the diagram, fielding positions are shown for a right hand bowler approaching over-the-wicket to bowl to a right-handed batsman. Off side field positions in this diagram include the slips, gully, point, cover, mid-off, third man, and long off. Because of the typical line of attack of bowlers, the off side is usually more well-defended than the leg side, which in the diagram includes the fielding positions fine leg, square leg, mid-wicket, mid-on, and long on.

Some common batting strokes that are played through the off side include straight drive to long off, the cover drive, the square cut, the late cut, and the glance to third man. Batsmen skilled in strokeplay through these regions, particularly square of the wicket and through the covers, often become favorites for fans to watch because of the relative difficulty of mastering such shots. Various batsmen have distinguished their style and success through the off side, including such greats as Sachin Tendulkar, Brian Lara, Garfield Sobers, Kumar Sangakkara, Jacques Kallis, Rohit Sharma, Chris Gayle, Virender Sehwag, and Sourav Ganguly.

See also
Cricket terminology
Leg side
Fielding (cricket)

References

Cricket terminology